Dragonfly, in comics, may refer to:

Dragonfly (AC Comics), an AC Comics superheroine
Dragonfly (DC Comics), a DC Comics supervillainess
Dragonfly (Marvel Comics), a Marvel Comics supervillainess
 Dragonfly and Dragonflyman (Ahoy Comics) heroes from The Wrong Earth.

See also
Dragonfly (disambiguation)